Elvira Albertovna Khasanova (born 10 January 2000) is a Russian racewalking athlete of Tatar descent. She qualified to represent the Russian Olympic Committee at the 2020 Summer Olympics in Tokyo 2021, competing in women's 20 kilometres walk.

References

External links
 

2000 births
Living people
Russian female racewalkers
Athletes (track and field) at the 2020 Summer Olympics
People from Mozhga
Olympic athletes of Russia
Volga Tatars
Tatar sportspeople
Tatar people of Russia
Sportspeople from Udmurtia